Frank "Bucky" O'Connor (December 21, 1913 – April 22, 1958) was a college men's basketball coach. He was the head coach of the Iowa Hawkeyes men's basketball team from 1949 to 1958. Born in Monroe, Iowa, O'Connor spent much of his early life playing golf, as his parents managed a country club. O'Connor attended and played basketball at Newton High School and Drake University; he became team captain in his senior year of college despite his slight frame and bad eyesight. After graduating, he coached at Boone High School and Harrisburg High School. When the United States entered World War II, O'Connor joined the United States Army Air Corps, serving in Japan and climbing to the rank of captain.

After the war, he held jobs in the athletic departments at Boone High and Boone Junior College, and ultimately joined the Iowa Hawkeyes athletic staff as the freshman basketball coach and head golf coach in 1948. In 1950, O'Connor took charge of the Hawkeyes' basketball team after the first two coaches of the 1949–50 season stepped down. He became the official coach in the 1951–52 season, in which the team achieved a 19–3 record and a second-place finish in the Big Ten Conference. O'Connor is best known in Iowa basketball history for recruiting and coaching the players who comprised the "Fabulous Five": Sharm Scheuerman, Bill Seaberg, Carl Cain, Bill Schoof and Bill Logan. This team first came together during the 1953–54 season, finishing second in the Big Ten with an 11–3 conference record (17–5 overall). The team won the Big Ten in the next two seasons, advancing to the Final Four both times. In the 1955–56 season, which was the Fabulous Five's final season together, the Hawkeyes won 17 consecutive games and advanced to their only National Collegiate Athletic Association (NCAA) championship game in school history, where they lost to the University of San Francisco, marking the end of Iowa's most successful era of basketball.

O'Connor coached the Hawkeyes for the next two seasons, compiling a combined record of 21–23 before dying in a highway accident on April 22, 1958, at the age of 44. He had one daughter, Kathy, born to his wife Jane.

In recent years several relatives of O'Connor were involved with the men's basketball program at Iowa.  His grand-nephew, Jim O'Connor, played as a walk on from 1988–92 and three more of his great-nephews served as student managers with the team: Tom O'Connor (2009-2014), Pat O'Connor (2013-2017), and Brendan O'Connor (2015–2019).

O'Connor died in a car accident in 1958.

Head coaching record

See also
 List of NCAA Division I Men's Final Four appearances by coach

References

Bibliography
 

1913 births
1958 deaths
American men's basketball coaches
American men's basketball players
Basketball coaches from Iowa
Basketball players from Iowa
Drake Bulldogs men's basketball players
Iowa Hawkeyes men's basketball coaches
People from Jasper County, Iowa